Costa Gazi was an anti-apartheid activist in the underground South African Communist Party (SACP) and later the Pan Africanist Congress of Azania (PAC),  both of which were illegal organisations. Post-apartheid, he has worked as head of public health at Cecilia Makewane Hospital in Mdantsane, East London, South Africa, where he criticized the policies of the ruling African National Congress (ANC), notably the AIDS denialism of then-President Thabo Mbeki.

Early life and education
Gazi's family, of Greek extraction, ran a small shop or "cafe" in Krugersdorp, where he worked as a boy. A star student at Krugersdorp High School, he enrolled in the  University of the Witwatersrand at the age of 16, to study civil engineering but switched to a medical degree. Impressed by the then-illegal The Communist Manifesto, and radicalized by the Sharpeville massacre, he joined the Congress of Democrats and the underground South African Communist Party.

Exile, move to the PAC, and post-apartheid role
Jailed in 1964, and banned from political activity in 1966, Gazi went abroad in 1968 to further his studies, and left the SACP over its support for the crushing of the Prague Spring by the Union of Soviet Socialist Republics in 1968. He moved to the PAC, an unusual step as the PAC had almost no white members, and was widely regarded as a violently anti-white party.

Gazi returned to South Africa in 1990, standing unsuccessfully as a PAC candidate in the 1994 elections. Post-apartheid he achieved notoriety after being stabbed at a PAC rally by a member who targeted him because he was white, and then for defying government orders banning the use of anti-retroviral medicines. At the time he served as public health secretary for the PAC. As a result, he faced disciplinary charges by the Eastern Cape provincial health department, most of which were thrown out of court.

References

South African people of Greek descent
University of the Witwatersrand alumni
White South African anti-apartheid activists
South African Communist Party politicians
Pan Africanist Congress of Azania politicians
1935 births
Living people